Ascandra atlantica is a species of calcareous sponge from Cape Verde.

References 

Animals described in 1908
Fauna of Cape Verde
atlantica